Ruscus hypoglossum is  a small evergreen shrub with a native range from Italy north to Austria and Slovakia and east to Turkey and Crimea. Common names include spineless butcher's-broom, mouse thorn and horse tongue lily. The species name comes from two Greek words ὑπό (hypo) and γλῶσσα (glōssa) meaning under and tongue.

Description
True leaves are smaller green appendages around the flowers. Plants are dioecious, with male and female flowers produced on separate plants.

Gallery

Etymology
Ruscus is derived from an old Latin name for prickly plants.

The specific epithet hypoglossum is derived from Greek and means 'sheathed beneath' or 'below-a-tongue'. The name is in reference to the cladodes of this species, which extend beneath the flowers.

References

hypoglossum
Plants described in 1753
Taxa named by Carl Linnaeus
Dioecious plants